KLIK (1240 AM), branded as Newstalk 1240, is a radio station broadcasting a News Talk Information format. Licensed to Jefferson City, Missouri, United States, the station serves the Columbia, Missouri area. The station is currently owned by Cumulus Media and features programming from ABC Radio and Westwood One.  KLIK also operates a local news operation with sister station KFRU (1400 AM in Columbia, Missouri). As of late 2018, KLIK has been operating on FM on 103.5 with translator K278CT.

From 1954 until September 8, 1999, KLIK was located at 950 AM, transmitting with a daytime power of 5000 watts and a nighttime power of 500 watts (directional) from a four tower array about 3.2 miles south of Jefferson City.

Early owners of KLIK broadcast a varied format of news and talk programs including music programs of middle of the road, top 40, adult contemporary and country music as 95 KLIK. For many years, KLIK and KJFF as the two largest regional radio stations (the most powerful AM and FM station in the region) dominated radio listenership in cumulative market share in the Columbia-Jeff City Market of Central Missouri.

In the 1970s and early 1980s KLIK was known as the Live 95 as its broadcasts were all programmed by live deejays, talk hosts and newscasters rather than by a satellite or automation system.

KLIK once operated with an FM sister station in the 1970s and 1980s known was KJFF 106.9 FM, a 100,000 watt semi-automated easy listening music station with a large regional coverage signal.

In the early 1980s KLIK and KJFF-FM together were sold by the local Jefferson City operators to a regional group broadcaster, and newspaper publisher, Brill Media.

In about 1982, KJFF-FM 106.9 FM became an adult contemporary music station, initially with a satellite delivered music format, and easy listening music was phased out, along with the KJFF call letters, which were replaced by the new FM call signs of KTXY. KLIK 950 AM transitioned over from AC/Contemporary music at about the same time to a 24-hour-a-day live country/western format known as 95 Country. KLIK carried a variety of programming and a mostly country music format until the late 1990s.      
 
Until February 6, 2009, locally produced programming included "Jefferson City's Morning News with Jay Kersting" and "Partyline"—a show which dates back to 1954—with Rick Sinclair. Locally produced newscasts are currently anchored by David Gaines.

The station also now airs syndicated programming from Laura Ingraham, Jonathon Brandmeier, Phil Valentine, Clark Howard, John Batchelor, and Michael Medved.  America at Night and America in the Morning with Jim Bohannon are also featured.

Sports programming
KLIK is the local radio home for Westwood One Radio Network coverage of the NFL, and a limited schedule of NCAA football and basketball coverage.  KLIK also broadcasts MRN and PRN broadcasts of NASCAR Sprint Cup races.  Weekdays 4:00 to 6:00 PM KLIK simulcasts The Closers, a regional sports program, with KFRU-AM based in Columbia, Missouri.

References

External links

LIK
News and talk radio stations in the United States
Radio stations established in 1998
Cumulus Media radio stations